Kattalai is a 1993 Indian Tamil-language action film directed by Liaquat Ali Khan, starring Sathyaraj and Bhanupriya. It was released on 25 June 1993.

Plot 

Sabarathnam is the son of Natarajan, who has no job and spends his time reading newspapers. Sabarathnam is the sole breadwinner of his family. He would try to bring down all the atrocities happening in the society. He falls in love with Vijaya.

Cast 
 Sathyaraj as Sabarathnam
 Bhanupriya as Vijaya
 Anandaraj as Rangarajan
 R. Sundarrajan as Natarajan
 Radha Ravi as Venkadachalam
 Sri Vidhya
 Kavitha

Music 
Soundtrack was composed by Ilaiyaraaja and lyrics written by Vaali. In an interview, Liaquat Ali Khan said initially A. R. Rahman was booked as the composer; due to producer's concern he was replaced by Ilaiyaraaja.

Reception 
The Indian Express called it a "crude remake" of Liyakat's previous film Ezhai Jaathi. New Straits Times wrote "Kattalai will go down well with Sathyaraj fans but for those who are not particularly thrilled by his presence, you may find it difficult to shake off that deja vu feeling that you have seen all these before".

References

External links 
 

1990s Tamil-language films
1993 action films
1993 films
Films scored by Ilaiyaraaja
Indian action films